Villaurbana (Biddobrana in Sardinian language) is a comune (municipality) in the Province of Oristano in the Italian region Sardinia, located about  northwest of Cagliari and about  east of Oristano. 

Villaurbana borders the following municipalities: Allai, Mogorella, Oristano, Palmas Arborea, Ruinas, Siamanna, Usellus, Villa Verde.

References

Cities and towns in Sardinia